Schulensee is a lake in Schleswig-Holstein, Germany. At an elevation of 11 m, its surface area is 0.13 km².

Lakes of Schleswig-Holstein
LSchulensee